Nathalie Saba (born 1998 is an Egyptian singer. Her debut song, "Snow", was written and recorded on Europa. Saba describes the song as "about not taking things at face value, when you reach a certain place in your life where you realize that not everything that's beautiful on the outside is beautiful on the inside."

Discography 
 2015: Snow
 2016: Black Birds

References

1998 births
21st-century Egyptian women singers
Living people
Singers from Cairo